Baker Street is a ten-issue comic book series created by Gary Reed and Guy Davis, and published by Caliber Comics between 1989 and 1991.

Publication history
The series consists of two story arcs "Honour Among Punks" written by Reed and Davis and "Children of the Night" written by Davis alone, who also provided the bulk of the art (with some early fill-in inking).

Plot

It features an alternative Sherlock Holmes world where the values and class system of Victorian era England carried over into a late 20th Century where World War II never occurred. The story mainly concerns a group of punks attempting to solve a series of murders reminiscent of the Jack the Ripper killings of the late 19th century.

Collected editions

Ten issues were published and collected in two trade paperbacks (one for each story arc) by Caliber:

Honour Among Punks (collects Baker Street #1-5, 175 pages, 1993)
Children of the Night (collects Baker Street #6-10, 178 pages, 1993)

and then as a single volume:

Honour Among Punks (iBooks, 352 pages, 2003, paperback, hardcover)
Honour Among Punks: The Complete Baker Street Graphic Novel (Milk and Cookies Press, paperback, 368 pages, 2008)

Awards
1990: Nominated for "Best New Series" Harvey Award

See also
Sherlock Holmes pastiches
List of steampunk works

Notes

References

External links
Gary Reed's page on the series
SF Site review of Honour Among Punks: The Complete Baker Street Graphic Novel
An interview with Gary Reed in which he talks about the formation of Caliber Press, and Baker Street

American comics
1989 comics debuts
1991 comics endings
Detective comics
Sherlock Holmes pastiches
Comics about Jack the Ripper